The badminton women's team tournament at the 2021 Southeast Asian Games was held from 16 to 18 May 2022 at the Bac Giang Gymnasium, Bắc Giang, Vietnam.

Schedule
All times are Vietnam Standard Time (UTC+07:00)

Bracket

Quarter-finals

Singapore vs Philippines

Vietnam vs Malaysia

Semi-finals

Thailand vs Singapore

Vietnam vs Indonesia

Finals

Thailand vs Indonesia

See also
Individual event
Men's team tournament

References

Men's team